The 2019 Major League Baseball (MLB) First-Year Player Draft was held from June 3 to 5, 2019. The draft assigned amateur baseball players to MLB teams. The draft order was set based on the reverse order of the 2018 MLB season standings. In addition, compensation picks were distributed for players who did not sign from the 2018 MLB Draft and for teams that lost qualifying free agents. The first 41 picks, including the first round and compensatory picks, were broadcast by MLB Network on June 3, and the second round was streamed on MLB.com directly following the first round. The remainder of the draft was streamed online from June 4 to 5.

The Baltimore Orioles, who had the worst record of the 2018 MLB season, selected Adley Rutschman with the first overall pick in the draft. The Atlanta Braves received the ninth overall pick as compensation for failing to sign Carter Stewart. The Arizona Diamondbacks received the 26th overall pick as compensation for failing to sign Matt McLain. The Los Angeles Dodgers received the 31st overall pick as compensation for failing to sign J. T. Ginn. The Pittsburgh Pirates received the 37th overall pick for failing to sign Gunnar Hoglund. As a result of surpassing the luxury tax threshold by over $40 million, the Boston Red Sox' top pick dropped down 10 places in the draft.

Andrew Vaughn of the Chicago White Sox made his debut on April 2, 2021, making him the first player from the 2019 draft to make his major league debut.

First round selections

Compensatory Round

Competitive Balance Round A

Other notable selections

Notes
Compensation picks

Trades

References

Major League Baseball draft
Draft
Major League Baseball draft
Major League Baseball draft
Baseball in New Jersey
Events in New Jersey
Sports in Hudson County, New Jersey
Secaucus, New Jersey